Retrospectacle may refer to:

Retrospectacle: The Best of Thomas Dolby, a 1994 album
Retrospectacle – The Supertramp Anthology, a 2005 album